In Your Face is the second and final studio album released by Canadian boy band b4-4 in 2003 in three editions: the general release and the Limited Edition (only for Germany) and a Special Edition. The release dates were 30 June and 17 November 2003. Three singles were released from the album: "Player", "I'll Be There" and "Feel Free (To Say No)".

Track list
General release
Intro (2:01)
Process of Elimination (3:46)
Player (You're My Ecstasy) (3:40)
Senorita (3:24)
Bad Girl (3:57)
Stop (4:12)
You Believed in Me (3:23)
Feel Free (To Say No) (3:47)
Skitz-A-Frenik (3:45)
Another Lonely Night (3:26)
Because I Love You (3:27)
Baby You're The One (3:38)
Take It Away From Me (4:44)
Everyday (3:59)

Limited edition 
(Released in Germany)
Same as general release, plus
Human Nature
Hard to Say I'm Sorry

Special Edition
Intro
Process of Elimination
Player (You're My Ecstasy) (Video Version)
Senorita
I'll Be There (Video Version)
Stop
Bad Girl
You Believed in Me
Feel Free (To Say No) (Video Version)
Skitz-A-Frenik
Another Lonely Night
Because I Love You
Baby You're The One
Take It Away From Me
Everyday
Get Down
Endlessly
Exclusive & Special Video Greetings

External links
Before Four - In Your Face

2003 albums
B4-4 albums